Joan Majó i Cruzate (born 19 June 1938) is a Spanish politician who served as minister of industry and energy from July 1985 to July 1986.

References

External links

1939 births
Living people
Polytechnic University of Catalonia alumni
Industry ministers of Spain